Baqerabad-e Do (also Romanized as Bāqerābād-e Do; also known as Bāqerābād) is a village in Kavirat Rural District, Chatrud District, Kerman County, Kerman Province, Iran. At the 2006 census, its population was 73, in 15 families.

References 

Populated places in Kerman County